Saya may refer to:

People 
 Gaetano Saya (born 1956), Italian politician
 John Nada Saya (born 1978), Tanzanian long-distance runner
 Saya Aye (1872–1930), major painter from Mandalay
 Saya Ito (born 1999), Japanese kickboxer
 Saya Mochizuki (born 1976), former Japanese idol and model
 Saya Myit (1888–1966), major painter of Buddhist works for religious sites in Lower Burma
 Saya San (1876–1931), monk, a physician and the leader of the “Saya San Rebellion” of 1930–1932 in Burma
 Saya Saung (1898–1952), early Burmese watercolorist famous in Burma for his landscape works
 Saya Sayantsetseg, Mongolian concert pianist and professor of music
 Saya Takagi (born 1963), Japanese actress turned activist
 Saya Tin (1892–1950), Burmese composer
 Saya Woolfalk (born 1979), American artist known for her multimedia exploration of hybridity, science, race, and sex
 Saya Yūki, Japanese actress

Places 
 Saya, Aichi, a former town in Aichi, Japan
 Saya de Malha Bank
 Saya (river), a river in Perm Krai, Russia
 Saya Station, a train station on the Meitetsu Bisai Line located in Aisai, Aichi Prefecture, Japan

Fictional characters 
 Saya, the heroine of the visual novel Saya no Uta
 Saya, a video game character in Samurai Shodown
 Saya, the antagonist of the crossover video game Namco × Capcom
 Saya, a character in the anime film Inuyasha the Movie: Swords of an Honorable Ruler
 Saya, a character in novels Summer Love and Saaya by Subin Bhattarai
 Saya Minatsuki, one of the main characters of the manga Black Cat
 Saya Shindo, a character in the manga and anime series Tokko
 Saya, a character in the manga and anime series Peacemaker Kurogane
 Saya Tokido, a character in a visual novel and corresponding original video animation Little Busters! Ecstasy (EX)
  Saya, a character in the anime film Blood: The Last Vampire
 Saya Otonashi, a character in the anime television series Blood+
 Saya Kisaragi, the main character of the anime television series Blood-C
 Saya Endo, a character in the anime Dagashi Kashi
 Saya (サヤ), a character in the tokusatsu Seijuu Sentai Gingaman
 Saya Yamabuki, drummer of the band Poppin'Party from the BanG Dream! franchise
 Saya, a character in the South Korean television series Arthdal Chronicles (2019)
 Saya, a character from the anime Wandering Witch: The Journey of Elaina

Other uses
 Saaya (novel), 2014 Nepali novel by Subin Bhattarai, sequel to Summer Love 
 , the Japanese term for a scabbard
 Saya (folklore), a summer feast and festival Turkic and Altai folklore
 Saya (poem), the type of poem or song that a Takam-Chi chants while playing a Takam
 Saya (artform), a particular type of music of Bolivia
 Saya, Nepal
 Saya language, a Chadic dialect cluster of Nigeria
 Sino-American Youth Ambassadors, a program run by Ameson Education and Cultural Exchange Foundation
 Saya, a traditional long skirt worn in the Philippines as part of the baro't saya

Japanese feminine given names

id:Saya